IMEA may refer to:

 Illinois Music Educators Association, a state-level organization promoting music education
 India, Middle East and Africa, a group of countries
 Indian Ministry of External Affairs, the foreign affairs agency of the government of India
 Eandis IMEA, a Belgian electrical power distribution company
 Interim Measures Extension Agreement, of the Clayoquot Sound Central Region Board
 Innovation in Music and Entertainment Awards, presented as part of the Popkomm trade show
 International Music and Entertainment Association, an American volunteer website with Awards